Exaeretia nigromaculata is a moth of the family Depressariidae. It is found in Greece, Turkey and western Tajikistan.

References

Moths described in 1989
Exaeretia
Moths of Europe
Moths of Asia